Chelsey Tregear (also known as Chelsey Nash) is a former Australian netball player in the ANZ Championship, formerly playing for the Melbourne Vixens.

Career
Tregear is a versatile netballer capable of covering WA, C and GA. After co-captaining the Melbourne Kestrels in the Commonwealth Bank Trophy. She missed selection for the inaugural season of the ANZ Championship in 2008. She captained Victorian Fury to success in the Australian Netball League in 2008. It was this form that earned her, as Chelsey Nash, a callup to the Melbourne Vixens squad.

Tregear made her ANZ Championship debut in round one of the 2009 season.  At the end of the 2009 season, she was awarded "Rookie of the Year" by the Vixens and was chosen for the Australia national netball team, known as the Diamonds. However she was dropped from the 2010/11 Squad.

Tregear is a qualified Podiatrist with the Moorabin Foot Centre, although she has changed to playing netball under her husband's surname for the 2011 ANZ Championship Season.

References

1983 births
Living people
Australian netball players
Australia international netball players
AIS Canberra Darters players
Victorian Fury players
Melbourne Kestrels players
Melbourne Phoenix players
Melbourne Vixens players
ANZ Championship players
Victorian Netball League players
Australian Netball League players
Netball players from Victoria (Australia)